The Pârâul Cheii (also: Valea Cheii) is a right tributary of the Pârâul Mic in Romania. It flows into the Pârâul Mic southeast of Râșnov.

References

Rivers of Romania
Rivers of Brașov County